The following is a list of squads for each nation competing at 1998 UEFA European Under-21 Championship in Romania. The tournament started on 23 May and the final took place in Bucharest on 31 May 1998.

Players born on or after 1 January 1975 were eligible to play in the tournament. Each nation had to submit a squad of 20 players, two of which had to be goalkeepers. If a player was injured seriously enough to prevent his taking part in the tournament before his team's first match, he could be replaced by another player.

Players in bold have later been capped at full international level.

Coach: Hannes Löhr

Coach: Ioannis Kollias

Coach: Hans Dorjee

Coach: Nils Johan Semb

Coach: Victor Pițurcă

Coach: Mikhail Gershkovich

Coach: Iñaki Sáez

Coach: Lars-Olof Mattsson

References

UEFA European Under-21 Championship squads
1998 UEFA European Under-21 Championship